The 1998 Investor Swedish Open was a men's tennis tournament played on outdoor clay courts in Båstad, Sweden that was part of the World Series of the 1998 ATP Tour. It was the 51st edition of the tournament and was held from 6 July until 12 July 1998. First-seeded Magnus Gustafsson won the singles title.

Finals

Singles

 Magnus Gustafsson defeated  Andriy Medvedev, 6–2, 6–3
 It was Gustafsson 2nd singles title of the year and the 9th of his career.

Doubles

 Magnus Gustafsson /  Magnus Larsson defeated  Lan Bale /  Piet Norval, 6–4, 6–2

References

External links
 ITF tournament edition details

Rado Open
1998
1998 in Swedish tennis
July 1998 sports events in Europe